Gene Deer is an American blues, rock, and country musician/singer/songwriter based out of Indianapolis, Indiana. Regularly playing shows at the historic Slippery Noodle Inn in Indianapolis, he has recorded and released two LPs for the Slippery Noodle Sound label.

He was voted the "Best Local Blues Band" for nine consecutive years (1995–2003) by the readers of Nuvo Newsweekly.

In 2002, Gene was hired by Indy car driver Kenny Brack as band leader and musical director for Kenny Brack and the Subwoofers, which toured with the Indy Racing League in 2003. Kenny Brack and the Subwoofers released a CD "Live in Nashville" featuring former Lynyrd Skynyrd guitarist Ed King.

In 2007, he did a tour of South Africa with a support band called The Raging Calm.

Discography

Soul Tender

Released 1994
C'mon Back
Nature of the Beast
Don't Turn Your Back (on the Blues)
Every'thang Gonna Be Alright
Midnight Healing
Be Set Free
Deep River Blues
That Ain't Why
Erin's Blues
My Baby She's Gone
Whisper in My Ear (bills to pay, bye bye)

Livin' With The Blues

Released 1997
Just Shoulda' Lay'd Off'a the Booze
Too Far Gone
I Want Out
One Foot on the Road
Good with the Bad
Livin' with the Blues
Smokestack Lightning
Potato Soup
Can't Afford to Pay the Rent
Blues in the Afternoon
Morristown
Dream

References

External links
 Slippery Noodle Sound – The Slippery Noodle Inn's record label official site.
 IRL – Indy Racing League official website.
 Kenny Brack – Kenny Brack official website

American blues guitarists
American blues singers
Lead guitarists
American country guitarists
American male guitarists
Living people
American rock guitarists
Country musicians from Indiana
American country singer-songwriters
Year of birth missing (living people)
American male singer-songwriters
Singer-songwriters from Indiana